Alata River is small river in Erdemli ilçe (district) of Mersin Province, Turkey

Geography
In the upper reaches it is usually called  Sorgun Creek. Presently its estuary is in the urban fabric of Erdemli.

History
According to the 1892 map drawn by Vital Cuinet and the 1897-salname (provincial annal) of Adana, Alata  was the border line between Mersin and İçil districts (which were later merged with). At the estuary there was an active commercial pier. According to researcher Mehmet Mazak, during 1880-1920 term, Alata pier was the only Mediterranean pier between Mersin and Taşucu piers. Presently there is only a small fishing pier.

Hydroelectric power plant

A dam on the Alata River under the supervision of Turkish State Hydraulic Works is under construction. The dam will serve for irrigation as well as energy production.

References

Rivers of Mersin Province
Erdemli District
Energy in Turkey
Rivers of Turkey